The 2019–20 Austrian Hockey League season began on 13 September 2019.  The defending champion's are EC KAC.

Following the conclusion of his previous season Croatian club, KHL Medveščak Zagreb, announced their withdrawal from the EBEL citing financial difficulties. With the reduction to the 11 team league, the EBEL announced changes in the second round of the season, taking place from 26 January 2020.

The placement round will be reduced to a pool of 5 teams, qualifying automatically for the post-season while each playing 8 games for seeding. The bottom placed 6 teams are drawn into the Qualifying round with each team playing 10 games, with the highest 3 ranked clubs advancing to the post-season.

The season was prematurely ended on 3 March 2020 due to concerns about the 2020 coronavirus outbreak in Europe.

Teams

Standings

Regular season
()
Legend:

Placement round

Qualification round

Playoffs

References

External links 

Erste Bank Eishockey Liga Statistics

Austrian Hockey League seasons
Aus
2019–20 in Croatian ice hockey
2019–20 in Italian ice hockey
2019–20 in Hungarian ice hockey
2019–20 in Czech ice hockey
Austrian Hockey League